Mackie Osborne is an American artist responsible for the design and illustrations of many music albums since the 1980s. She is a member of the band Fleabag and has contributed to many albums on packaging artwork, layout design and art direction.

Being the wife of Melvins frontman Buzz Osborne, she also designed the artwork for most of the band's albums since 1994. She has also been in various Melvins-related bands and side projects, such as Get Hustle (which featured Melvins 2000–2001 rhythm guitarist and 2006 tour bassist David Scott Stone) and Gashley Snub (which also featured David Scott Stone and Melvins drummer Dale Crover).

Artwork

References

External links 
 Website

Living people
Artists from California
Year of birth missing (living people)